Raffray is a surname. Notable people with the surname include:

 Achille Raffray (1844–1923), French diplomat, traveller, zoologist, and entomologist
 André Raffray (1925–2010), French graphic artist

Surnames of French origin